Lars Johansson (born 29 May 1950) is Swedish social democratic politician, and member of the Riksdag since 2002.

References
Lars Johansson (S)

1950 births
Living people
Members of the Riksdag from the Social Democrats
Members of the Riksdag 2002–2006
Place of birth missing (living people)
Members of the Riksdag 2006–2010
Members of the Riksdag 2010–2014